is a railway station on the Keisei Kanamachi Line in Katsushika, Tokyo, Japan, operated by the private railway operator Keisei Electric Railway.

Lines
Shibamata Station is served by the Keisei Kanamachi Line.

Station layout
This station consists of two opposed side platforms serving two tracks.

History
The Station opened on 3 November 1912.

Station numbering was introduced to all Keisei Line stations on 17 June 2010. Shibamata was assigned station number KS50.

Surrounding area
 Shibamata Taishakuten
 Edogawa River

See also
 List of railway stations in Japan

References 

Railway stations in Tokyo
Railway stations in Japan opened in 1912